Violet May Burnside (April 19, 1915, Lancaster, Pennsylvania – November 19, 1964, Washington, DC) was an American jazz saxophonist and bandleader.

Burnside worked for much of her career in all-female bands. She worked in Bill Baldwin's group in the mid-1930s, joined the Dixie Rhythm Girls in 1937, then joined the Harlem Play-Girls in 1938.

During World War II she joined the International Sweethearts of Rhythm and played USO concerts with them. She continued with this ensemble until 1949, then formed her own group, which toured as Vi Burnside's All-Girl Band and Vi Burnside's All Stars. Her sidewomen included Flo Dreyer and Pauline Braddy; the group toured mostly in the mid-Atlantic region. She played with Anna Mae Winburn in Harlem in 1953, and worked with her own groups into the 1960s, in addition to acting as an official in a local DC musicians' union.

References
Howard Rye, "Violet Burnside". The New Grove Dictionary of Jazz. 2nd edition, ed. Barry Kernfeld.

External links
International Sweethearts of Rhythm Collection Spotlight, Because of Her Story, Smithsonian Institution

American jazz saxophonists
Jazz musicians from Pennsylvania
1915 births
1964 deaths
20th-century American saxophonists
Women jazz saxophonists
20th-century women musicians
Musicians from Lancaster, Pennsylvania
International Sweethearts of Rhythm members